The Witchfinder  is  a BBC Two sitcom created, written, and directed by the Gibbons brothers. The series is executive produced by Steve Coogan, and Christine Langan, and produced by Dave Lambert for Baby Cow Productions. It stars Tim Key and Daisy May Cooper.

Premise
Set in 1645, during the English Civil War, Cooper plays a suspected witch being escorted by Key across East Anglia for a witch trial. Key plays a failing, chauvinistic, pompous witchfinder for whom the seemingly simple journey risks becoming an ordeal.

Cast
 Tim Key as Gideon Bannister
 Daisy May Cooper as Thomasine Gooch
 Jessica Hynes as Old Myers
 Daniel Rigby as Hebble
 Tuwaine Barrett as Cumberlidge
 Reece Shearsmith as Matthew Hopkins
 Michael Culkin as Lord Salisbury
 Rosie Cavaliero as Mrs. Jennings
 Dan Skinner as Beekeeper
 Ricky Tomlinson as Crockett

Production
The series was commissioned for BBC Two in October 2019 by channel controller Patrick Holland and Shane Allen, Controller of Comedy Commissioning. Filming ran from June to July 2021.

The BBC has reportedly decided not to order a second series.

Reception
On 9 January 2023 the show received a nomination at the Comedy.co.uk Awards 2022.

References

External links

2022 British television series debuts
BBC television sitcoms
2020s British sitcoms
English Civil War fiction
English-language television shows